Orange UnsignedAct (known as mobileAct Unsigned during its first series) was a Channel 4 talent competition, with bands and artists competing for a recording contract with Universal Music, a £60,000 advance, a single released after the series, an album deal and a multi-media marketing campaign.

(The £60,000 was disbursed as follows: 50% on completion of the recording contract and confirmation of the winner and 50% on delivery of the final mixed, mastered and cleared album.)

The show was sponsored by Orange and Sony Ericsson.

Finalists
2007
 Envy & Other Sins
 Revenue
 Mancini
 Ginger Bread Men
 Bad Robots

2008/2009
 Scarlet Harlots
 Hip Parade
 Tommy Reilly

Winners
Envy & Other Sins won mobileAct Unsigned on 23 December 2007. As a result, their first single "Highness", was released on 3 March 2008.

Tommy Reilly won the competition with his song "Gimme A Call".  The winner was announced live on Channel 4 at 2:40 pm on Sunday 25 January 2009.  The song entered the UK Top 40 at number 14 on 1 February 2009.

Transmission
Sundays T4 (Channel 4) and 4Music, UK

See also
Orange Playlist – a similar music TV show sponsored by Orange and hosted by Laverne
Pringles Unsung – a similar competition

References

External links
 Official Site
 Unsigned Act on Channel 4 
 Ginger Bread Men

Channel 4
Orange S.A.
2007 British television series debuts
2000s British music television series